Sydney "Syd" Ashley (23 February 1880 – 20 January 1959) was a South African international rugby union player. Born in Cape Town, he attended Diocesan College before playing provincial rugby for Western Province. He made his only Test appearance for South Africa during Great Britain's 1903 tour. He played at centre for the 2nd Test of the series, a 0–0 draw in Kimberley. Ashley died in 1959, in Somerset West, at the age of 78.

References

South African rugby union players
South Africa international rugby union players
Rugby union centres
1880 births
1959 deaths
Rugby union players from Cape Town
Alumni of Diocesan College, Cape Town
Western Province (rugby union) players